WAHP may refer to:

 WAHP (FM), a radio station (88.5 FM) licensed to serve Belton, South Carolina, United States
 WHRT-FM, a radio station (91.9 FM) licensed to serve Cokebury, South Carolina, which held the call sign WAHP from 2014 to 2019